Paradoxica proxima is a moth of the family Erebidae first described by Michael Fibiger in 2011. It is found in south-eastern China and northern Vietnam.

The wingspan is 11–12 mm. The forewings are short and very broad and the ground colour is brown. There are blackish-brown patches basally at the costa and in the quadrangular upper medial area. The crosslines are weakly marked and dark brown. The terminal line is indicated only by darker interveinal dots. The hindwing ground colour is dark grey with a discal spot.

References

Micronoctuini
Moths described in 2011